is a Japanese heavy construction machinery company that produces mini excavators, excavators, compact track loaders and wheel loaders. In 1971 Takeuchi introduced the first compact excavator. The company has wholly owned subsidiary facilities in the United States (1979), United Kingdom (1996), France (2000) and China (2006).

Takeuchi was founded in 1963 as an environmental equipment manufacturer. They were the first company to introduce the compact excavator to North America, setting the stage for one of the highest-growth product segments ever introduced in the compact equipment market. The compact excavator market has become a main product for rental and construction/utility companies.

Gallery

References

External links 

  

Construction equipment manufacturers of Japan
Companies based in Nagano Prefecture
Companies listed on the Tokyo Stock Exchange
Manufacturing companies established in 1963
Japanese brands
Japanese companies established in 1963